Beloved Enemy is a 1936 American drama film directed by H.C. Potter and starring Merle Oberon, Brian Aherne, and David Niven. It was loosely based on the life of Michael Collins.

Plot
During the Irish War of Independence in 1921, Irish rebel leader Dennis Riordan (Aherne) and English aristocrat Helen Drummond (Oberon) meet and fall in love. Riordan is pursued, however, by British army officer Captain Preston (Niven).

The original film ended with Riordan getting shot and killed, but did not do well at the box office. A happier ending was also filmed which has Riordan being shot but surviving; all subsequent versions have. The original cut has since been lost.

The movie has several comic relief scenes: after a raid on an IRA "safe house", British officers grumble about being not being able to find Riordan, who is in fact standing just behind them; when the Irish Delegation goes to a formal ball and is asked by the footman for their names to be announced, the delegation replies in Irish.

Cast

 Merle Oberon as Helen Drummond
 Brian Aherne as Dennis Riordan
 Karen Morley as Cathleen O'Brien
 Henry Stephenson as Lord Athleigh
 David Niven as Capt. Gerald Preston
 Jerome Cowan as Tim O'Rourke
 Donald Crisp as Liam Burke
 Ronald Sinclair as Jerry O'Brien
 Granville Bates as Ryan
 P.J. Kelly as Rooney 
 Leo McCabe as Connor
 Pat O'Malley as Patrick Callahan
 Jack Mulhall as Casey
 Claude King as Colonel Loder
 Wyndham Standing as Thornton
 Robert Strange as Perrins
 Lionel Pape as Crump
 John Burton as Hall
 Leyland Hodgson as Hawkins
 Frank Roan as Murphy
 Wally Maher as Humphries
 Theodore von Eltz as Sean O'Brien
 David Torrence as Alroyd
 Denis O'Dea as Sean

Bibliography
 Marill, Alvin H. Samuel Goldwyn Presents. A. S. Barnes, 1976.

External links
 
 Beloved Enemy on Lux Radio Theater: December 27, 1937

1936 films
1930s English-language films
1936 drama films
American black-and-white films
United Artists films
Films directed by H. C. Potter
Films set in Ireland
Samuel Goldwyn Productions films
Films set in 1921
Irish War of Independence films
Films set in Dublin (city)
American war drama films
Cultural depictions of Michael Collins (Irish leader)
Films about the Irish Republican Army
1930s war drama films
1930s American films
Films with screenplays by John L. Balderston